Haplolobus may refer to:

 Haplolobus (plant), a plant genus in the family Burseraceae
 Haplolobus (beetle), a beetle genus in the tribe Tropiphorini